Elizabeth Chapman is a children's author.

Elizabeth or Beth Chapman may also refer to:

Elizabeth Chapman in United States National Cyclo-cross Championships
Beth Chapman (politician), American politician
Beth Chapman (bounty hunter)